Obai (Arabic: أبي) is an Arabic given name, most commonly transliterated as "Ubai". also It is also sometimes transliterated as "Obai", "Ubay", "Ubai", "Oubai", "Oubay", "Obay", "Ubayy", & "Obayy" The word is derived from the tri-consonant Arabic word for "refuse" and could possibly mean The one who is refusing the  humiliation

The most well-known historical figure to be named Ubai was Ubay ibn Ka'b a companion of the Islamic prophet Muhammad and a person of high esteem in the early Muslim community

People with the name
Ubayy ibn Ka'b, Arabic companion of the Islamic prophet Muhammad 
Ubay Luzardo, Spanish footballer

Arabic masculine given names